The ATI Wonder series represents some of the first video card add-on products for IBM Personal Computers and compatibles introduced by ATI Technologies in the mid to late 1980s. These cards were unique at the time as they offered the end user a considerable amount of value by combining support for multiple graphics standards (and monitors) into a single card. The VGA Wonder series added additional value with the inclusion of a bus mouse port, which normally required the installation of a dedicated Microsoft Mouse adapter.

The VGA Wonder series later merged with the ATI Mach series of cards in 1990. The ATI Graphics Ultra (VRAM) and ATI Graphics Vantage (DRAM) cards both featured independent VGA Wonder ASICs in addition to their Mach8 8514 compatible graphics processor. The Graphics Ultra was later renamed the VGA Wonder GT. In 1992, their following product line, the Mach32, integrated the VGA wonder core and coprocessor into a single IC. At this point the VGA Wonder line was cancelled and replaced with a cost reduced DRAM based version of Mach32 known as the "ATI Graphics Wonder".

MDA/CGA cards

Release Date: 1986

ATI Graphics Solution Rev 3
 Chipset: ATI CW16800-A
 Supports: Hercules Graphics Card mode and extended 132x25 / 132x44 text-modes on TTL monochrome monitors
 Supports: All CGA modes on both CGA/EGA and TTL monochrome monitors
 Switching between CGA and Hercules compatibility is done via supplied utility (VSET.EXE) and doesn't require a reboot
 Composite video output is available on an internal 3-pin connector (no support for colors, works only in the 40x25 text-mode or 320x200 graphics modes)
 Port: 8-bit PC/XT bus

ATI Color Emulation Card 
 Did at least support CGA graphics output to a TTL monochrome monitor

ATI Graphics Solution plus (1987)
 Chipset: ATI CW16800-B
 Supports CGA, Plantronics Colorplus CGA & Hercules Graphics Card graphics modes
 Compatible with MDA, CGA (and therefore also EGA displays), DIP switch selectable
 64kb of DRAM
 Port: 8-bit PC/XT bus
Graphics Solution Plus SP
 Chipset: ATI CW16800-B
 Adds Serial/Parallel Ports
Graphics Solution SR
 Chipset: ATI CW16800-B
 Uses Static RAM

ATI Small Wonder Graphics Solution (1988)
 Chipset: ATI 18700
 Also known as Graphics Solution Single Chip or just GS-SC
 Single-chip version of the Graphics Solution plus
 64kb of static RAM
 Composite output
Graphics Solution Single Chip or GS-SC with Game (1988)
 Includes a game port
 Lacks external composite video connector

EGA cards

Release Date: 1987

ATI EGA Wonder (March 1987)
 Chipset: ATI16899-0 + CHIPS P86C435
 Supports CGA, Hercules mono & EGA graphics modes
 Removes support for plantronics mode/Single-page Hercules mode/composite output
 Compatible with MDA, CGA and EGA displays (DIP switch selectable)
 Internal composite video port for machines such as IBM 5155 Portable
 256kb DRAM
 Port: 8-bit PC/XT bus
 Original MSRP: $399
ATI EGA Wonder 480
 Cost reduced EGA Wonder 800, lacking jumpers, RCA and feature connector. Different BIOS.
ATI EGA Wonder 800
 Added support for extended EGA text and graphics modes (requires multisync monitor)
 Added support for 16-colour VGA modes
ATI EGA Wonder 800+
 Rebadged VGA Edge lacking the analogue VGA port
 Chipset: ATI 18800
 Can auto-detect monitor type connected (DIP switches no longer present)

VGA cards
Release Date: 1987

ATI VIP or VGA Improved Performance (1987)

 Chipset: ATI 16899-0 & Chips P82C441
 Supports CGA, Hercules mono, EGA & VGA graphics with Softsense automatic mode switching
 Compatible with MDA, CGA, EGA and VGA displays (DIP switch selectable)
 9-pin TTL and 15-pin analogue connectors
 256kb DRAM
 Port: 8-bit PC/XT bus
 Original MSRP: $449 ($99 for Compaq expansion module)
ATI VGA Wonder (1988)
 Chipset: ATI 18800
 Adds support for SVGA graphics modes
 Adds support for monitor auto-sensing (switchless configuration)
 Uses on-board EEPROM to store configuration information
 256kb or 512kb DRAM
 Port: 8-bit PC/XT bus
ATI VGA Edge 8
 Cost Reduced VGA Wonder
 256KB DRAM

ATI VGA Wonder-16 (1988)
 Speed enhancements due to a wider bus
 VGA pass through connector
 Bus mouse connector
 256KB or 512KB DRAM
 Port: 16-bit PC/AT bus (ISA), 8-bit compatible
 Original MSRP: $499 or $699 respectively
ATI VGA Edge-16
 Cost reduced VGA Wonder 16
 Lacks the bus mouse connector and the digital TTL output
 256kb DRAM (not expandable to 512kb)
ATI VGA Wonder+ (1990)

 Chipset: ATI 28800-2, -4, or -5
 Based on a new chipset which claimed to offer speeds rivalling VRAM based cards
 Dual page mode memory access
 Dynamic CPU/CRT interleaving
 256KB or 512KB DRAM
ATI VGA Integra (1990)
 Cost reduced version based on new ATI 28800 ASIC
 Lacks bus mouse connector
 Uses a much smaller PCB with a surface mount BIOS & RAMDAC
 Supports SVGA Graphics with 72 Hz refresh rates
 512KB DRAM
ATI VGA Basic-16 (1990)
 PCB layout similar to VGA Integra but using cheaper RAMDAC
 Only supports the basic 60 Hz VGA modes of the IBM VGA standard from 1987
 256KB DRAM (not upgradable)
ATI VGA Charger (1991)
 Similar to VGA Basic-16, but can be upgraded to 512KB
ATI VGA Wonder XL (May 1991)
 Sierra RAMDAC adds support for 15-bit colour in 640x480@72 Hz, 800x600@60 Hz
 Supports a flicker-free vertical refresh rate of 72 Hz
 256KB, 512KB or 1MB DRAM
 Original MSRP: $229, $349, $399 respectively
ATI VGA Stereo·F/X

 Chipset: ATI 28800
 Combines a VGA Wonder XL with a Sound Blaster 1.5
 Features "fake" stereo sound
 512KB or 1MB DRAM
ATI VGA Wonder XL24 (1992)
 Contains a Brooktree Bt481KPJ85 RAMDAC that adds support for hi and true colour graphics modes
 512KB or 1MB DRAM
ATI VGA Wonder 1024
 A series of OEM cost reduced versions of several VGA Wonder models
 Typically lacks the bus mouse connector and/or the digital TTL output

See also
 All-in-Wonder – ATI's line of combination graphics/TV tuner cards (which re-used the "Wonder" trademark)
 List of AMD graphics processing units

External links
 YJFY Computer Component Museum
 IT Blog: Full ATI TimeLine 1984-2006 
 VGA Legacy
 techPowerUp! GPU Database

Computer-related introductions in 1986
Graphics cards
ATI Technologies products